Dębe Wielkie  is a village in Mińsk County, Masovian Voivodeship, in east-central Poland. It is the seat of the gmina (administrative district) called Gmina Dębe Wielkie.

The village has a population of 2,750. It is the birthplace of Polish socialist revolutionary Stefan Okrzeja.

References

Villages in Mińsk County